New Vessel Press is an independent publishing house specializing in the translation of foreign literature and narrative nonfiction into English. New Vessel Press books have been widely reviewed in publications including The New York Times, The Wall Street Journal, The New York Review of Books, and O, The Oprah Magazine. They have also garnered numerous awards. What's Left of the Night, a novel about the poet C. P. Cavafy by Ersi Sotiropoulos and translated from the Greek by Karen Emmerich, won the 2019 National Translation Award in Prose.

History

Origins 

New Vessel Press was co-founded by writer/translator Ross Ufberg and author/journalist Michael Z. Wise in 2012, with the intention of bringing foreign literature to English-speaking audiences. Its first books were published in 2013.

New Vessel Press books are distributed to bookstores and online vendors throughout the United States by Consortium Book Sales & Distribution; they are distributed in Canada by Publishers Group Canada and in the United Kingdom and Ireland by Turnaround Publisher Services. All NVP titles are also available as ebooks and many as audiobooks.

"Ross and Michael have really spun gold out of nothing; they've really made an instant classic out of New Vessel," John Oakes, director of the New School Publishing Institute and co-founder of OR Books, told Crain's New York Business in May 2017.

Artwork 
Book covers for New Vessel Press translations have been created by graphic artist Liana Finck and Beth Steidle.

List of works 
Fall 2013/Winter 2014
 The Good Life Elsewhere by Vladimir Lorchenkov
 Cocaine by Pitigrilli
 Killing the Second Dog by Marek Hlasko
 Fanny von Arnstein: Daughter of the Enlightenment by Hilde Spiel
 Some Day by Shemi Zarhin
 The Missing Year of Juan Salvatierra by Pedro Mairal

Fall 2014/Winter 2015
 I Called Him Necktie by Milena Michiko Flašar
 Who is Martha? by Marjana Gaponenko
 Guys Like Me by Dominique Fabre
 All Backs Were Turned by Marek Hlasko

Spring 2015
Fall 2014/Winter 2015
 Alexandrian Summer by Yitzhak Gormezano Goren
 Killing Auntie by Andrzej Bursa

Fall 2015/Winter 2016
 Oblivion by Sergei Lebedev
 The 6:41 to Paris by Jean-Philippe Blondel
On the Run with Mary by Jonathan Barrow
 The Last Weynfeldt by Martin Suter
Animal Internet by Alexander Pschera
The Last Supper by Klaus Wivel

Fall 2016/Winter 2017
 If Venice Dies by Salvatore Settis
 Year of the Comet by Sergei Lebedev
 Moving the Palace by Charif Majdalani
 The Madonna of Notre Dame by Alexis Ragougneau
 A Very Russian Christmas: The Greatest Russian Holiday Stories of All Time 
 Adua by Igiaba Scego

2017/2018

 The Madeleine Project by Clara Beaudoux
 A Very French Christmas: The Greatest French Holiday Stories of All Time
 The Animal Gazer by Edgardo Franzosini
 Neapolitan Chronicles by Anna Maria Ortese
 Allmen and the Dragonflies by Martin Suter
 The Eye: An Insider's Memoir of Masterpieces, Money, and the Magnetism of Art by Philippe Costamagna

2018/2019
 What's Left of the Night by Ersi Sotiropoulos
 A Very Italian Christmas: The Greatest Italian Holiday Stories of All Time
 Allmen and the Pink Diamond by Martin Suter
 The Goose Fritz by 
 Sleepless Night by Margriet de Moor
 Exposed by Jean-Philippe Blondel

2019/2020
 The Bishop's Bedroom by Piero Chiara
 And the Bride Closed the Door by Ronit Matalon
 A Very Scandinavian Christmas: The Greatest Nordic Holiday Stories of All Time 
 The Drive by Yair Assulin
 Villa of Delirium by Adrien Goetz
 I Belong to Vienna by Anna Goldenberg

2020/2021
 The Piano Student by Lea Singer
 A Very German Christmas: The Greatest Austrian, Swiss and German Holiday Stories of All Time
 Untraceable by 
 Roundabout of Death by Faysal Khartash
 Distant Fathers by Marina Jarre

2021/2022
 The Vanished Collection by Pauline Baer de Perignon
 A Very Irish Christmas: The Greatest Irish Holiday Stories of All Time
 Pollak's Arm by Hans von Trotha
 Palace of Flies by Walter Kappacher
 A Few Collectors by Pierre Le-Tan
 Of Saints and Miracles by Manuel Astur

2022/2023
 A Very Mexican Christmas: The Greatest Mexican Holiday Stories of All Time
 The Words That Remain by Stênio Gardel
 Return to Latvia by Marina Jarre
 A Present Past: Titan and Other Chronicles by Sergei Lebedev
 Professor Schiff's Guilt by Agur Schiff
 Where I Am by Dana Shem-Ur
 Café Unfiltered by Jean-Philippe Blondel

References 

Book publishing companies based in New York City